"Something Childish But Very Natural" is a short story written by Katherine Mansfield in 1914. It was first published posthumously in the Adelphi. It was republished in Something Childish and Other Stories (1924).

Plot summary
At a train station, Henry looks at books and comes upon Samuel Taylor Coleridge's poem. Then he jumps onto the train as he is late, and has left his portfolio behind. On the train, he starts talking to a girl, until she tells him she will be there again every evening. On the following Saturday, he goes to the station and sees her; they get on the train and start talking like old friends.
Later, they go to a concert, and she appears somewhat distant. They walk down the streets of London and come upon a pretty village nearby. There, they visit a house and decide to rent it. Then Henry receives a telegram, and things fall apart.

Characters
Henry. He is almost 18 years old and works in an architect's office.
Edna. She is 16 years old and goes to a training college to be a secretary. Her mother is Hungarian.

Major themes
Love
Family
The transitional period between childhood and adolescence
The tension between fantasy and reality

Literary significance
The text is written in the modernist mode, without a set structure, and with many shifts in the narrative.

Footnotes

External links 
 Something Childish But Very Natural at the New Zealand Text Centre

Modernist short stories
1914 short stories
Short stories by Katherine Mansfield
Works originally published in The Adelphi
Short stories published posthumously